Cenicientos is a municipality in the Community of Madrid, Spain. It is located in the southwesternmost end of the region. The municipality covers an area of 67.49  km2. , it has a population of 1,980.

References 

Municipalities in the Community of Madrid